Leucoanthocyanidin (flavan-3,4-diols) are colorless chemical compounds related to anthocyanidins and anthocyanins. Leucoanthocyanins can be found in Anadenanthera peregrina and in several species of Nepenthes including N. burbidgeae, N. muluensis, N. rajah, N. tentaculata, and N. × alisaputrana.

Such compounds include:
 Leucocyanidin
 Leucodelphinidin
 Leucofisetinidin
 Leucomalvidin
 Leucopelargonidin
 Leucopeonidin
 Leucorobinetinidin
 Melacacidin
 Teracacidin from Acacia obtusifolia and Acacia maidenii heartwoods

Leucoanthocyanidins have been demonstrated to be intermediates in anthocyanidin biosynthesis in flowers of Matthiola incana.

Bate-smith recommended in 1954 the use of the Forestal solvent for the isolation of leuco-anthocyanins.

Metabolism
Leucoanthocyanidin dioxygenase uses flavan-3,4-diols to produce 3-hydroxyanthocyanidins. The gene encoding the enzyme (PpLDOX) has been identified in peach and expression has been studied in Vitis vinifera.

References

 
Vicinal diols